Jacky Ben-Zaken (born 1967 in Mazkeret Batya) is an Israeli businessman from Ashdod. His main business focus is in yielding real estate. He is also known as owner of the Israeli Premier League football club F.C. Ashdod.

Early life

Ben-Zaken was born in 1967 in Mazkeret Batya. He moved to Ashdod after his mother second marriage. The family was not wealthy and he worked in random coming works (like flowers sale) during his school years. After his military service in IDF he started to work in insurance agency belonging to Efraim Gur - one of the leaders of Georgian community in Israel.

Politics

When in 1988 Efraim Gur was elected to Knesset Ben-Zaken became his parliamentary adviser. In 1993 Ben-Zaken was elected to Ashdod municipality as leader of "Tzeirey Ashdod" faction.

Real estate
In 1997, in partnership with Avraam Nanikashvili and old friend, retired footballer Haim Revivo he initiated Filgar LTD company. Using explosive population growth of Ashdod the company upgraded their business facilities and the group started to invest in yielding real estate across the Israel. In 2005 they bought financial group "Financial Levers LTD". Using successful capital raising in Tel Aviv Stock Exchange "Financial Levers LTD" started in series of acquisitions in Israel and abroad mainly in Texas, Russia and Kazakhstan.

F. C. Ashdod

Ben-Zaken is head of management of F.C. Ashdod. Under their rule the club stabilized and keep a position in the upper part of the Israeli Premier League. The Ashdod football school is one of the best in the country and the club based on its own players.

Stock manipulation 
Ben=Zaken served 16 months in an Israeli prison after being convicted for stock manipulation and was released on April 1, 2018.

References

1967 births
Living people
Israeli Jews
Israeli businesspeople
People from Ashdod
F.C. Ashdod
Israeli football chairmen and investors
Israeli people of Moroccan-Jewish descent